Faemino–Faema was a professional cycling team that existed from 1968 to 1970. Faema's most prominent rider was Eddy Merckx who won his first four grand tours with the team.

Major results
Sources:
1968
 GP Monaco, Roger Swerts
 Romana Lombardo, Eddy Merckx
 GP Lugano, Eddy Merckx
 Overall Giro di Sardegna, Eddy Merckx
Stages 1 & 5b, Eddy Merckx
Stage 3, Guido Reybrouck
 Stage 4a TTT Paris–Nice
 Stage 1 Tirreno-Adriatico, Vittorio Adorni
 Overall Volta Ciclista a Catalunya, Eddy Merckx
Stage 1, Guido Reybrouck
Stages 2 & 6b, Eddy Merckx
Stage 6a, Roger Swerts
 Stages 2 & 4 Setmana-Catalana, Guido Reybrouck
 Stage 3 Setmana-Catalana, Eddy Merckx
 Trofeo Dicen, Eddy Merckx
 Stage 2 Tour of Belgium, Eddy Merckx
 Paris-Roubaix, Eddy Merckx
 De Brabantse Pijl, Victor Van Schil
 Stage 13 Vuelta a España, Victor Van Schil
 Overall Tour de Romandie, Eddy Merckx
Stage 1b, Eddy Merckx
 Overall  Giro d'Italia, Eddy Merckx
Team Cassification
Mountains Classification, Eddy Merckx
 Points Classification, Eddy Merckx
Stages 1, 8 & 12, Eddy Merckx
Stages 3, 11 & 22, Guido Reybrouck
Stage 10, Emilio Casalini
Stage 13, Lino Farisato
 Giro delle Tre Provincie, Luciano Armani
 Tre Valli Varesine, Eddy Merckx
 Omloop der Zennevallei, Victor Van Schil
 Stage 2 Paris–Luxembourg, Guido Reybrouck
 Baden-Baden, Vittorio Adorni
 Heist-op-den-Berg, Victor Van Schil
 Circuit des Frontières, Guido Reybrouck
 Paris - Tours, Guido Reybrouck
 Overall A Travers Lausanne, Eddy Merckx 
Stages 1 & 2, Eddy Merckx

References

External links

Defunct cycling teams based in Italy
Defunct cycling teams based in Belgium
1968 establishments in Italy
1970 disestablishments in Belgium
Cycling teams established in 1968
Cycling teams disestablished in 1970
Faema